The Emu Bay Shale is a geological formation in Emu Bay, South Australia, containing a major Konservat-Lagerstätte (fossil beds with soft tissue preservation). It is one of two in the world containing Redlichiidan trilobites. The Emu Bay Shale is dated as Cambrian Series 2, Stage 4, correlated with the upper Botomian Stage of the Lower Cambrian.

Its mode of preservation is the same as the Burgess shale, but the larger grain size of the Emu Bay rock means that the quality of preservation is lower. More than 50 species of trilobites, non-biomineralized arthropods, palaeoscolecids, a lobopodian, a polychaete, vetulicolians, nectocaridids, hyoliths, brachiopods, sponges, chancelloriids, and a chelicerate are known from the Emu Bay Shale.

Description 
The Emu Bay Shale of Kangaroo Island, South Australia, is Australia's only known Burgess-Shale-type Konservat-Lagerstätte, and includes faunal elements such as Anomalocaris, Tuzoia, Isoxys, and Wronascolex, in common with other Burgess-Shale-type assemblages, notably the Chengjiang Biota in China, the closest palaeogeographically, although somewhat older. A few genera of non-biomineralized arthropods, among them Squamacula, Kangacaris, and the megacheiran Tanglangia, are known only from the Emu Bay Shale and Chengjiang.  The site is also the source of high-quality specimens of trilobites such as Redlichia takooensis, Emuella polymera, Balcoracania dailyi, Megapharanaspis nedini, Holyoakia simpsoni, and Estaingia (=Hsuaspis) bilobata. Balcoracania and Emuella are the only known genera of the distinctive Redlichiina family Emuellidae, known for possessing the greatest number of thoracic segments  known for Trilobita as a whole (a record of 103 in one Balcoracania specimen), and so far entirely restricted to Australia and Antarctica.

The sedimentary depositional environment of the majority of Burgess-Shale-type assemblages is outer shelf, deeper water. The Emu Bay Shale in contrast, appears to represent deposition in restricted basins on the inner shelf, indicating that soft tissue preservation occurred in a range of environmental settings during the Cambrian. Some Emu Bay fossils display extensive mineralization of soft tissues, most often of blocky apatite or fibrous calcium carbonate, including the oldest phosphatized muscle tissue – along with records from Sirius Passet in Greenland, the first thus far reported from the Cambrian. Mid-gut glands are preserved three-dimensionally in calcium phosphate in the arthropods Isoxys and Oestokerkus, as in related species from the Burgess Shale.

The type section of the Emu Bay Shale crops out on the east side of Emu Bay where it conformably overlies the White Point Conglomerate. Here it yields a rich assemblage of Estaingia, Redlichia, hyolithids, brachiopods, and the scleritome-bearing Chancelloria. At the Big Gully locality (8 km east of White Point), its presumed correlative is unconformable on the White Point Conglomerate and yields soft-bodied fossils in addition to the trilobites, including two species of the giant predator Anomalocaris (A. briggsi and Anomalocaris cf. canadensis), Isoxys, Tuzoia, two species of the nektaspid arthropod Family Emucarididae (Emucaris fava and Kangacaris zhangi), the palaeoscolecid worm Wronascolex, the problematic Myoscolex and Vetustovermis, and a number of rarer elements. The Big Gully trilobites rarely preserve any trace of non-biomineralized tissue; a small number of specimens of Redlichia have been reported with antennae. Taxa documented from a quarry located inland of the shoreline exposure at Big Gully include Oestokerkus, a genus of leanchoiliid closely related to the well-known Leanchoilia, the early chelicerate Wisangocaris and the type species of a monotypic genus of artiopodan arthropod, Australimicola. An armoured lobopodian of the Family Luolishaniidae is known from a single specimen that closely resembles an unnamed species from the Burgess Shale popularly known as Collins' Monster.

In 2011, seven fossils of large, isolated compound eyes were described from the inland quarry site at Emu Bay, as well as the first well-preserved visual surfaces of the eyes of Anomalocaris. The latter specimens are consistent with anomalocaridids being closely related to arthropods as had been suspected. The find also indicated that advanced arthropod eyes had evolved very early, before the evolution of jointed legs or hardened exoskeletons. The eyes were 30 times more powerful than those of trilobites, long thought to have had the most advanced eyes of any species contemporary with Anomalocaris and which were only able to sense night or day.

Paleobiota 
After and others

Arthropods

Other animals

See also 
 Lagerstätte—other fossil localities
 List of fossil sites (with link directory)

References 
NOTE: Much of the text of this article was used with permission of Sam Gon III from his below referenced web site, in particular from the Emu Bay page

Further reading 
References about Australian trilobites:

External links 
 The Palaeontology of the Lower Cambrian Emu Bay Shale

 
Cambrian System of Australia
Shale formations
Shallow marine deposits
Fossiliferous stratigraphic units of Oceania
Paleontology in Australia
Geology of South Australia
Kangaroo Island